Canyon Ferry Dam is a concrete gravity dam in a narrow valley of the Missouri River, United States, where the Big Belt Mountains and the Spokane Hills merge, approximately  downstream from the confluence of the Gallatin, Madison, and Jefferson rivers, and about  east of the city of Helena, Montana. The dam is for flood control, irrigation, recreation and hydroelectric power.  The building of the dam created a reservoir known as Canyon Ferry Lake.

Background

In 1941, the first study for the dam was carried out by the Bureau of Reclamation, the Montana Water Board and Montana Power Company. The dam and power plant were part of the Pick-Sloan Plan and approved by the Flood Control Act of 1944 which was signed on December 22. Known as the Canyon Ferry Unit, construction began on May 24, 1949, and was completed on June 23, 1954. On December 18, 1953, the power plant's first generator became operational and the other two went online in 1954.

The original dam was constructed between 1896 and 1898 by the Helena Water and Electric Power Company.

Design

The dam's spillway is located on its central portion and is controlled by four radial gates. Adjacent to the spillway is the dam's power plant which contains three 16.5 MW Francis turbine generators for an installed capacity of 50 MW. Each turbine is fed with water by a  diameter penstock.

References

External links 

U.S. Reclamation website: Canyon Ferry Unit
Canyon Ferry Dam and Visiting Center website
Helena History website

Dams in Montana
Buildings and structures in Lewis and Clark County, Montana
Hydroelectric power plants in Montana
Gravity dams
United States Bureau of Reclamation dams
Energy infrastructure completed in 1954
Dams completed in 1954
Dams on the Missouri River
1954 establishments in Montana